Kire Filipovski (born 3 April 1973) is a Macedonian swimmer. He competed at the 1992 Summer Olympics and the 1996 Summer Olympics.

References

1973 births
Living people
Macedonian male swimmers
Olympic swimmers as Independent Olympic Participants
Olympic swimmers of North Macedonia
Swimmers at the 1992 Summer Olympics
Swimmers at the 1996 Summer Olympics
Place of birth missing (living people)